"Eres" (Eng.: You Are) is a song written by Juan Fernando Fonseca, recorded by Mexican singer Alejandro Fernández, and included on the album Viento a Favor.

Release
The track was released as the third single from the album Viento a Favor while the singer performed on his world tour.

Charts

References

2008 singles
2007 songs
Alejandro Fernández songs
Song recordings produced by Áureo Baqueiro
Sony BMG Norte singles
Songs written by Fonseca (singer)